Fernando María Félix Mateo Juan Nepomuceno de Norzagaray y Escudero (19 July 1808 - 12 September 1860) was a Spanish soldier and colonial governor. Of Basque descent, he was a lieutenant general before becoming the 104th Governor of Puerto Rico and the 78th Governor of the Philippines under Spanish colonial rule. He also had a political career in Spain. In 1840 he was briefly Minister of War. On his return to Spain in 1860 he was made a senator, but he died the same year.

Early life
Norzagaray was born on 19 July 1808 in San Sebastián, Gipuzkoa, to military officer Fernando José Norzagaray y Casado, of Talavera de la Reina, and María Estefanía Faustina Juliana Escudero y Villanueva, of Pamplona. He was baptized on 29 July at the Basilica of Saint Mary of the Chorus, also in San Sebastián.

Puerto Rico

He did extensive infrastructure work in Puerto Rico. One example is the General Norzagaray Bridge, which crosses the Los Frailes stream. Arsenals were constructed, and a cavalry was created.

Philippines
Norzagaray authorized establishments of houses of foreign currency exchange on June 18, 1857, just two months after his ascendancy to governor. He ordered local administration reforms in September 1858 and reorganized the infantry in September 1859. In April 1859, ten Jesuit priests arrived in the Philippines, after being allowed again in the archipelago, to persuade Norzagaray to grant a Jesuit school be made. They were given the Escuela Municipal, which is the only primary school in Manila, on October 1, 1859. In 1858 he established a botanical garden, the Jardín Botánico, on the site now known as Mehan Garden.

Cochinchina Campaign

He sent Philippine troops to Cochinchina, southern Vietnam, in 1858 in a joint campaign with the French. Both Spain and France claimed to be defending Catholicism in Vietnam, with Spain reacting to the execution of bishop José María Díaz Sanjurjo at Nam Dinh, northern Vietnam, on July 20, 1857. The expedition raised hopes of increasing Philippine trade in Asia, however, Spain and its colony gained little long-term benefit from the four-year campaign.

At the Siege of Tourane, the Spanish navy was represented by the armed despatch vessel El Cano, only one of the initial 13 warships used during the campaign. The transport included a marine artillery battery and 1,000 troops drawn from the Spanish garrison of the Philippines, mostly Tagalogs and Visayans. It was put under the command of the French Admiral Charles Rigault de Genouilly. The combined Franco-Spanish force was forced to evacuate Tourane, giving way to the Vietnamese. The same force was used in the Siege of Saigon, which was put under the same French admiral, and garnered a victory for the combined Franco-Spanish force.

In 1860, most of the Spanish forces under the command of Admiral Bernardo Ruiz de Lanzarote were withdrawn on French request.  France went on to develop a colony in Vietnam.

Legacy
In the Philippines, the town of Norzagaray, which was formerly known as Casay, was renamed in his honor. During his term, he separated Casay from Angat and made the former a distinct town.

A street in the Old San Juan Historic District is named Calle Norzagaray.

Gallery

References

External links

Captains General of the Philippines
Governors of Puerto Rico
Members of the Senate of Spain
1808 births
1860 deaths